Longpao Subdistrict is a subdistrict in Luhe District, Nanjing, Jiangsu province, China. , it has 6 residential communities and 5 villages under its administration.

See also 
 List of township-level divisions of Jiangsu

References 

Township-level divisions of Jiangsu
Geography of Nanjing